The KBC are an indie band from Preston, Lancashire, England.

Band members
James Mulholland - vocals, keyboards, guitar 
Ric Ormerod - bass
Michael Brown - drums

Career
The KBC were formed by schoolmates James Mulholland, Richard Ormerod and Michael Brown in 2003. They signed to High Voltage Records in 2004 and quickly released their debut single, "Trippin", recorded in an afternoon at Noisebox Studios in Salford with Mancunian sonic-wizard Chris Snow. The limited pressing of 500 vinyl received a modest reception. 

It took another year for second single "Pride Before The Fall" to hit the shelves. This received a better reception and gained national radio play from the likes of Zane Lowe, Steve Lamacq and Jo Whiley. Extensive touring of the UK and Europe plus the release of breakthrough single "Not Anymore" landed them live sessions on BBC Radio 1 and BBC 6 Music with Steve Lamacq and Marc Riley respectively, as well as support slots with The Strokes, Arctic Monkeys, !!!, The Sunshine Underground, Friendly Fires, The Music, Peaches, Delphic, The Paddingtons, Forward Russia and Milburn. Several of their songs including Trippin, Pride Before The Fall and Best In The Business featured on the computer games Grand Theft Auto, Saints Row and World Championship Snooker.

They landed a deal with Japanese label Fabtone Records in 2006 and swiftly released the "Boxed Beats & Shelved Rhythms EP" - a collection of their UK singles, which featured remixes by The Whip and Performance. This was followed by the band's debut album, "On The Beat!", released in early 2007 reaching Number 2 in the Japanese record store charts. The delay, and eventual non-release of a UK LP ended with the band regretfully parting company with High Voltage Sounds. 

"Walking Disaster" was released on 22 October 2007 on their own label, Scattergraph. This was followed by a 2nd LP, The Trick, released in November 2008 via Fabtone in Japan. 

Following the demise of The KBC, Mulholland began work on a new project known as Techniques with more emphasis on studio work rather than live performances. 
Enlisting the help of Ormerod and Brown for live performances, they toured with Example in 2011, and their last performance as a trio was at French electro record label Kitsuné Maison's club night in Paris in May 2013.

Discography

Studio albums
Both records were only released in Japan.
 2007: On the Beat!
 2008: The Trick

Singles and EPs
"Trippin'" (High Voltage Sounds)
Released 7 March 2005.
Limited pressing 500 lemon 7".
"Pride Before The Fall" (High Voltage Sounds)
Released 6 February 2006.
Limited pressing 500 white 7"/500 CD.
"Sherlock Groove Holmes" (Playlouder Recordings)
Released 29 May 2006 as download only.
"Not Anymore" (High Voltage Sounds)
Released 10 July 2006.
Limited pressing 2500 7"/2500 CD.
"Test the Water" (High Voltage Sounds)
Released 27 November 2006
Boxed Beats & Shelved Rhythms EP (Fabtone Records)
Released 6 September 2006. A collection of previous singles and exclusive remixes released on enhanced CD format.
"Walking Disaster" (Scattergraph)
Released 22 October 2007.
La Musique EP (Fabtone Records)
Released 7 November 2007.

External links
The KBC on Myspace

English indie rock groups
Musicians from Preston, Lancashire